The 2019–20 season is the Esteghlal Football Club's 19th season in the Iran Pro League, and their 26th consecutive season in the top division of Iranian football. They also competed in the Hazfi Cup, and 74th year in existence as a football club.

Players

First team squad
Last updated:

Transfers

In

Out

Pre-season and friendlies

Competitions

Overview

Persian Gulf Pro League

Results summary

Results by round

League table

Matches

Hazfi Cup

Round of 32

Round of 16

Quarter-final

Semi-final

Final

AFC Champions League

Qualifying play-off

Preliminary

Play-off

Group stage

Knockout stage

Round of 16

Statistics

Squad statistics

|-
! colspan="18" style="background:#dcdcdc; text-align:center"| Players transferred/loaned out during the season

Goals

Clean sheets

Disciplinary record

References

External links
 Iran Premier League Statistics
 Persian League

Esteghlal F.C. seasons
Esteghlal